The Storm P. Museum in Copenhagen, Denmark, is a biographical museum dedicated to the life and oeuvre of Danish humorist Robert Storm Petersen, popularly known as Storm P. In addition to his cartoons, the museum also displays his paintings, both oils and watercolours, and covers other aspects of his life, time and many-sided talent, as well as his extensive collection of smoking pipes and his studio which has been reconstructed on the first floor. The ground floor is used for special exhibitions. In connection with a renovation in 2012, the museum has broadened its profile to include humor, satire and cartoons more generally.

The museum is based in a former police station, part of the listed complex of buildings surrounding Frederiksberg Runddel opposite the main entrance to Frederiksberg Gardens in Frederiksberg.

History

Site history

The building was constructed in the mid-1880s as Frederiksberg's first police station. It originally stood in blank, brownish-yellow brick and featured a prominent gable at the corner. The local police force left the building in 1919 when a new police station was inaugurated at Howitzvej, just north of Frederiksberg Gardens, as part of a complex which also included Frederiksberg Courthouse and a new fire station.

In the mid-1920s, the building became home to Frederiksberg Funeral Services (Frederiksberg Begravelsesvæsen). The gable was removed and the walls dressed in the current yellow colour to match the other buildings at the entrance to Frederiksberg Gardens.

The museum
The Storm P Museum took over the building in 1977 but it is still owned by the state. It was refurbished in the winter of 2011/12.

Storm P. exhibition
The Storm P. exhibition is now located in the first floor and comprises his studio which has been reconstructed in one of the rooms.

The museum's collection of his cartoons and other drawings comprises more than 30,000 of his works, although only a minor and changing selection is on display. The collection was digitized in connection with the 2012 renovation and it is now possible to explore it on iPads made available by the museum.

Storm P.'s interest in painting began during a visit to Paris in 1906 where he was struck by the Modernist and in particular Expressionist art that he saw as well as by the art cabarets and the Bohemian life style. Many of his paintings from this period depict Parisian nightlife. Edvard Munch, Henri de Toulouse-Lautrec and James Ensor were among his inspirations as a painter.

Storm P.'s collection of smoking pipes consists of approximately 450 pieces. Beginning with his own, he began to request pipes from his closest friends, and these personal memorabilia were later supplemented with different smoking utensils of prominent cultural figures. His collection finally diversified into comprising clay pipes, long pipes and finally intricately carved Meerschaum pipes. The pipes are on display in the Baroque cabinets which Storm P. acquired for the purpose. A minor selection of the more notable pieces have been moved to showcases in connection with the expansion of the museum.

Special exhibitions

References

External links

 Official website

Museums in Copenhagen
Biographical museums in Denmark
Cartooning museums
Listed buildings and structures in Frederiksberg Municipality
Museums established in 1977
1977 establishments in Denmark